Rothwell was a parliamentary constituency centred on the Rothwell area of West Yorkshire.  It returned one Member of Parliament (MP) to the House of Commons of the Parliament of the United Kingdom, elected by the first past the post system.

History 

The constituency was created by the Representation of the People Act 1918 for the 1918 general election.  It was abolished for the 1950 general election.

Boundaries
The Urban Districts of Ardsley East and West, Emley, Flockton, Horbury, Rothwell, and Stanley; and the Rural Districts of Hunslet, and Wakefield.

Members of Parliament

Election results

Election in the 1910s

Elections in the 1920s

Elections in the 1930s

Elections in the 1940s
General Election 1939–40:
Another General Election was required to take place before the end of 1940. The political parties had been making preparations for an election to take place from 1939 and by the end of this year, the following candidates had been selected; 
Labour: William Lunn
Conservative: H.J. White

References 

Parliamentary constituencies in Yorkshire and the Humber (historic)
Constituencies of the Parliament of the United Kingdom established in 1918
Constituencies of the Parliament of the United Kingdom disestablished in 1950